Janine Connes (born c. 1934) is a female French astronomer whose research led to the establishment of the Fourier transform infrared spectroscopy method, which was of major significance and laid the foundations of what was to grow into a significant new field.

Connes is married to Pierre Connes, a fellow astronomer; they often conducted research together.

Research
Connes' work is primarily in analysing the Fourier transform infrared spectroscopy technique, a field she began studying in 1954. Her thesis and subsequent publications gave in-depth analysis of the practical details necessary for its use, with her thesis credited for establishing many of the early design principles. With her husband Pierre Connes she imaged Venus and Mars at the Observatoire du Pic du Midi de Bigorre using the method, presenting images far better than others taken at the time. Connes identified the registration advantage of using interferometry.

Publications 
"The Field of Application of the Fourier Transform Method," J. Phys. Radium 19: 197 (1958)

"A Study of the Night Sky in the Near Infrared," J. Phys. Radium 21: 645 (1960), with H.P. Gush [in French]

"Near-Infrared Planetary Spectra by Fourier Spectroscopy. I. Instruments and Results," Journal of the Optical Society of America 56: 896 (1966), with P. Connes [in English]

The following four papers are" fundamental works of extreme importance to the field" -- Professor Ian McLean.

 "Spectroscopic Studies Using Fourier Transformations," Rev. Opt. 40 (no.2): 45 (1961) [in French]
 "Spectroscopic Studies Using Fourier Transformations," Rev. Opt. 40 (no.3): 116 (1961) [in French]
 "Spectroscopic Studies Using Fourier Transformations," Rev. Opt. 40 (no.4): 171 (1961) [in French]
 "Spectroscopic Studies Using Fourier Transformations," Rev. Opt. 40 (no.5): 231 (1961) [in French]
 "Fourier Transform Spectroscopy: Introductory Report," Mem. Soc. Roy. Sci. Liège 9: 81 (1964) [in French]

References

1934 births
20th-century French women scientists
Living people
Women physical chemists
French physical chemists
Women astronomers
20th-century French astronomers
Spectroscopists